Amityville Death House is a 2015 American horror film directed by Mark Polonia, written by John Oak Dalton, and starring Eric Roberts. It was released direct-to-video, and is the twelfth film to be inspired by Jay Anson's 1977 novel The Amityville Horror.

Plot 

During the 17th century, a white witch named Abigail Wilmont moved to Amityville after being run out of Salem. When Abigail's magic failed to save the life of a sick child, she was blamed for causing the child's illness in the first place, and lynched on the outskirts of Amityville. In the present, a warlock called the Dark Lord sets out to avenge Abigail's death by using a tarot deck and a Book of the Dead to resurrect Abigail as a semi-corporeal entity that he unleashes on Amityville.

While driving back home from a humanitarian trip to Florida, Tiffany Raymond and her friends Aric, Bree, and Dig stop in Amityville to visit Tiffany's grandmother, Florence. Florence, whose physical and mental health have been deteriorating ever since she found a diary that belonged to Abigail, lives in Abigail's old home, which has the same half moon-shaped upper windows as 112 Ocean Avenue. As Tiffany and her friends tend to Florence and read the diary, they are spied on by Abigail, who has begun slaughtering the descendants of the villagers who killed her back in the 1600s. The descendants include Florence and Tiffany.

After murdering five of the other descendants, Abigail snaps Florence's neck, and mesmerizes Aric and Dig into attacking Bree and Tiffany. During the struggle, Tiffany's blouse is ripped open to reveal that she has six breasts, a sign that she is a witch, according to the Dark Lord. Tiffany uses her own magic to bring Aric and Dig back to their senses, and together they attack Abigail, who fatally wounds Dig before being severely injured by Aric. Abigail proceeds to possess Florence's corpse, and then Bree. Abigail's possession causes Bree to mutate into a spider-like monster that kills Aric. Tiffany, having discerned that Abigail's power is tied to her diary, sets the book on fire; this causes Florence's house to explode, which attracts the attention of the passing Sheriff McGrath. One of the diary's pages is prevented from burning up completely by the oblivious McGrath.

Since her diary was not completely destroyed, Abigail was not vanquished, and the film ends with the reveal that she has possessed Tiffany.

Cast

Reception 

Tex Hula ranked Amityville Death House as the fifth worst out of twenty-one Amityville films that he reviewed for Ain't It Cool News. Hula noted that the film's poster and the sequence in which a woman transforms into a spider-like creature were the only impressive things about it, and further opined that the film's acting was even worse than The Amityville Haunting.

References

External links 

 

2015 direct-to-video films
2015 films
2015 horror films
2015 independent films
2010s exploitation films
2010s monster movies
2010s police films
2010s slasher films
2010s supernatural horror films
American body horror films
American direct-to-video films
American exploitation films
American films about revenge
American independent films
American monster movies
American police films
American sequel films
American slasher films
American supernatural horror films
Amityville Horror films
Direct-to-video horror films
Direct-to-video sequel films
Films about mass murder
Films about mind control
Films about shapeshifting
Films about spirit possession
Films about telekinesis
Films about telepathy
Films about undead
Films about witchcraft
Films about wizards
Films directed by Mark Polonia
Films set in the 1600s
Films set in 2015
Films set in forests
Films set in Long Island
Films set in New York (state)
Films shot in Pennsylvania
Films using stop-motion animation
Resurrection in film
Supernatural slasher films
Tarot in fiction
Teleportation in films
Unofficial sequel films
Witch hunting in fiction
2010s English-language films
2010s American films